Urszula Radwańska was the defending champion, but did not compete in the Juniors this year.

Laura Robson defeated Noppawan Lertcheewakarn in the final, 6–3, 3–6, 6–1 to win the girls' singles tennis title at the 2008 Wimbledon Championships. With this victory Robson became only the second British player in the open era to win a junior title at Wimbledon, following Annabel Croft's victory in 1984.

Seeds

  Melanie Oudin (second round)
  Arantxa Rus (quarterfinals)
  Noppawan Lertcheewakarn (final)
  Elena Bogdan (first round)
  Polona Hercog (quarterfinals)
  Jessica Moore (third round)
  Ana Bogdan (first round)
  Kurumi Nara (first round)
  Bojana Jovanovski (quarterfinals)
  Johanna Konta (third round)
  Ksenia Lykina (first round)
  Nikola Hofmanova (third round)
  Jessy Rompies (first round)
  Elena Chernyakova (second round)
  Linda Berlinecke (second round)
  Katarzyna Piter (second round)

Draw

Finals

Top half

Section 1

Section 2

Bottom half

Section 3

Section 4

References

External links

Girls' Singles
Wimbledon Championship by year – Girls' singles